The Chinese Government Award for Outstanding Self-financed Students Abroad [Chinese Title: 国家优秀自费留学生奖学金] is the highest government award granted by the Chinese government to Chinese students overseas, first established in 2003 by the China Scholarship Council (short name: CSC) of Ministry of Education of the People's Republic of China.  

The number of Chinese students studying abroad is more than half a million each year, the Academic Committee only considers doctoral students with outstanding academic achievements or great research potential during overseas study, and every year globally selects 650 young talents from different disciplines (500 before 2021), thus making this award highly competitive. 

To date, the recipients include Chinese students studying in the United States, EU countries, Canada, Singapore, Switzerland, Norway, Japan, Australia, etc. The awarding ceremony is held each year at the local Chinese Embassy or Consulate, the attendees usually include the Ambassador or General Counselor, Education Counselor, awardees and their supervisors, invited international guests, journalists, etc.

  The “self-financed students abroad” here refer to those students who do not use direct funding from the Chinese government, past winners are almost from overseas universities' doctoral students with full scholarships.

History

Before 2021

There are 500 students awarded yearly. Among them, no more than 10 extraordinary prizes go to the top awardees with a $10,000 cash award and the rest $6,000; each awardee will also receive a certificate.

Reform since 2021

Starting from 2021, the award opens up two groups to call for application, group A and B.

Group A recipient is selected from the self-financed Chinese students who are still pursuing their degrees, and the number of the recipient is 600 each year. Among them, no more than 20 extraordinary prizes go to the top awardees with a $10,000 cash award and the rest $6,000; each awardee will also receive a certificate.

Group B recipient is selected from the self-financed Chinese students who has obtained their degrees and planned to relocate back to China for working, including fresh graduates and postdoctoral researchers. To meet the eligibility, group B applicants need to provide a signed working contract with a domestic host, in addition to other required files, such as diploma, publication record, recommendation letters, etc. The number of group B recipient is 50 each year and every recipient will be awarded with a $10,000 cash award plus a certificate.

Eligibility
 The applicants must be of  P. R. China nationality, including citizenship of the Special Administrative Region of China - Hong Kong and Macao;
 The applicants have not spent any financial support from the Chinese government (e.g, CSC scholarship) during their studies;
 The applicants have not received this award before;
 The applicants in group A and B should be no more than 40 and 45 years old, respectively, by the application deadline;
 The applicants are at least in the second year of their PhD programme.

Application process

Voluntary application
The call is voluntary based, open to all self-financed Chinese students from any academic disciplines. The application is usually completed through an online system. When submitting their applications online, applicants need to indicate their local Chinese consulate, where their applications will be allocated for initial differential selection.

Initial selection by the local consulate
The local Chinese Consulate or Educational Affairs Office of Chinese Embassy will invite and organize experts, usually professors in notable universities in the local area, to conduct an initial differential selection based upon the applicants' achievement record and merits, and forward the ranking/reserving list to the domestic competent department, Ministry of Education of China.

Finalist by domestic evaluators
Ministry of Education (MOE) will conduct the final evaluation or approval. Once the ranking is finalized, MOE will publish the finalist and inform the results to Chinese Consulates or Education Offices, who will later inform the individual awardees and hold an awarding ceremony.

Ceremony

The awarding ceremony is held each year at the local Chinese consulate. The attendees usually include the general consul, education counselors, evaluation experts, awardees and their supervisors, invited international guests, journalists, etc.

Past recipients

Notable recipients
Yuan Cao, MIT postdoc, 2018 Nature's 10, "graphene wrangler".
 Karson T. F. Kung, the first awardee of Hong Kong citizenship, PhD Cambridge University, now Assistant Professor at the University of Hong Kong.
Zhan Guo, Associate Professor at New York University
Peng Yin, Biologist
Xiaojun Yan, Political writer
Pengkai Pan, Founder and CEO of Alo7
Lerong Lu, Lawyer, Academic, and Writer, Lecturer in Law at University of Bristol
Wenjun Lu, Associate Professor at Norwegian University of Science and Technology

References

Education in China
Chinese awards
Academic awards in China